And Now in Colour was a radio comedy programme that aired on BBC Radio 4 for two series (each consisting of six half-hour episodes) and two half-hour Christmas specials between March 1990 and December 1991.  It starred Tim Firth, Tim de Jongh, Michael Rutger and William Vandyck and has since been repeated on BBC Radio 4 Extra, most recently in 2021.

References

External links
 Tim Firth's official website: http://www.timfirth.com
 
 Lavalie, John. "And Now in Colour" EpGuides. 21 Jul 2005. 29 Jul 2005.

BBC Radio 4 programmes
BBC Radio comedy programmes
1990 radio programme debuts